Jacques Follorou (born 1967) is a French journalist for Le Monde. He is the author of several books, including three about organized crime in Corsica.

Works

References

Living people
1968 births
French journalists